Walter Daniel Benítez (born 19 January 1993) is an Argentine professional footballer who plays as a goalkeeper for Eredivisie club PSV.

Club career
Benítez signed a four-year contract with Eredivisie club PSV in June 2022.

Personal life 
Benítez has a Paraguayan grandfather.

Career statistics

Honours 
PSV
Johan Cruyff Shield: 2022

References

External links

 Profile at the PSV Eindhoven website

1993 births
Living people
People from San Martín, Buenos Aires
Association football goalkeepers
Argentine footballers
Argentina under-20 international footballers
Argentine expatriate footballers
Argentine Primera División players
Ligue 1 players
Eredivisie players
Quilmes Atlético Club footballers
OGC Nice players
PSV Eindhoven players
Argentine expatriate sportspeople in France
Argentine expatriate sportspeople in the Netherlands
Expatriate footballers in France
Expatriate footballers in the Netherlands
Sportspeople from Buenos Aires Province
Argentine sportspeople of Paraguayan descent